Çamdere is a village in the Sincik District, Adıyaman Province, Turkey. The village is populated by Kurds of the Reşwan tribe and had a population of 1,771 in 2021.

The hamlets of Ağaçlı, Deliyusuf, Küllüce, Tepecik and Toptaş are attached to Çamdere.

References

Villages in Sincik District
Kurdish settlements in Adıyaman Province